Review of Scientific Instruments is a monthly peer-reviewed scientific journal published by the American Institute of Physics. Its area of interest is scientific instruments, apparatus, and techniques. According to the Journal Citation Reports, the journal has a 2018 impact factor of 1.587.

References

External links

Chemistry journals
Physics journals
Research methods journals
American Institute of Physics academic journals
Monthly journals
English-language journals